Jourdanton Independent School District is a public school district based in Jourdanton, Texas (USA).

In 2009, the school district was rated "academically acceptable" by the Texas Education Agency.

Schools
In the 2012–2013 school year, the district had students in five schools. 
High schools
Jourdanton High School (Grades 9–12)
Middle schools
Jourdanton Junior High (Grades 6–8)
Elementary schools
Jourdanton Elementary (Grades EE-5)
Alternative schools
Atascosa County Alternative School (Grades 6–12)
District Reassignment and Opportunity Center (Grades 6–12)

References

External links
 

School districts in Atascosa County, Texas